This is a list of albums and EPs released by Resist Records. Some of the label's recent releases have gained mainstream chart success. The most recent being Parkway Drive's third album, Deep Blue, debuting at number 2 in the ARIA Charts in 2010. Carpathian's Isolation debuted in the top 20 in its first week of release in 2008, and Parkway Drive's sophomore release Horizons, which debuted at number 6 in its first week of release. Along with CD releases, Resist has released ten 7" records, two 10" records and six 12" full length records.

Since Resist's first release, Found My Direction's Before Their Time 7", they have released over 100 CDs, EPs, 7", 10" and LPs.

Releases

RES001 Found My Direction – Before Their Time 7"
RES002 Where's the Pope? – PSI CD
RES003 Voice of Dissent – Self Titled CD
RES004 Vicious Circle – Perfect World Disaster CD
RES005 Age Of Distrust – Self Titled 7"
RES006 Frontside – Last Day CDep
RES007 Found My Direction – Burn All White Flags CD
RES008 Within Blood – First Blood
RES009 Home of the Brave – Compilation CD
RES010 Voice Of Dissent – Truth Untold CDep
RES011 Frontside – Photosynthesis CDep
RES012 Irrelevant – The Need For Divinity CDep
RES013 Demolition Highstyle – Ruin CDep
RES014 Ceasefire – The Cycle Of Unbelief CD
RES015 No Grace – Intentions CD
RES016 Within Blood – Captain Blood CD
RES017 Found My Direction – The Path Remains CD
RES018 Irrelevant – Reflecting And Refracting CDep
RES019 Voice Of Dissent – That Was Then CDep
RES020 Life Love Regret – Sick Of Goodbyes CD
RES021 The Killchoir Project – No Love For The Haters CDep
RES023 Stronger Than Hate – As Seasons Pass CDep
RES024 After The Fall – As Far As Thoughts Can Reach CDep
RES025 Day Of Contempt – See Through The Lies CD
RES026 One Way Out – Running Fast Headed Nowhere CDep
RES027 Last Nerve – Self Titled CD/7"
RES028 No Grace – Forced Expression CD
RES029 I Killed The Prom Queen – When Goodbye Means Forever CD
RES031 Taking Sides – Smash The Windows To The Dead Hearts CDep
RES032 Stronger Than Hate – Between Day And Darkness CD
RES033 Parkway Drive – Don't Close Your Eyes CDep
RES034 Shotpointblank – Heart Of A Disbeliever CD
RES035 Internal Affairs/Last Nerve – Split 7"
RES036 The Hot Lies – Streets Become Hallways CDep
RES037 Mindsnare – The Death LP
RES038 Irrelevant – Ascension CD
RES039 I Killed The Prom Queen – Your Past Comes Back to Haunt You CD
RES040 Forza Liandri – The Modus Operandi CDep
RES041 Taking Sides – Dress Code CD
RES042 The Dead Walk! – Reanimation CDep
RES043 H Block 101 – 1996-1999 CD
RES044 The Disables – Nuthin For No One CD
RES045 Parkway Drive – Killing With A Smile CD
RES046 Her Nightmare – No Heaven No Hell CD
RES047 Bad Blood – Harsh Reality CDep
RES048 Just Say Go! – Revive CD
RES049 Cry Murder – From The Shadow Of Doubt CD
RES050 Carpathian – Nothing to Lose CD
RES051 The Dead Walk!/Jungle Fever – Split 7"
RES052 The Dead Walk! – We Prowl The Streets CD
RES053 Panic – Circles CD
RES054 Betrayed – Substance CD
RES055 The Hope Conspiracy – Hang Your Cross CDep
RES056 The Hope Conspiracy – Death Knows Your Name CD
RES057 Miles Away – Brainwashed 7"
RES058 God So Loved The World – Self Titled CDep/10"
RES059 Icepick – Violent Epiphany CD
RES060 Mindsnare – Disturb The Hive CD/LP
RES061 Zombie Ghost Train – Dealing The Death Card CD
RES062 Miles Away – Rewind, Repeat CD
RES063 Internal Affairs – Deadly Visions CD
RES064 No Apologies – Survival CD
RES065 50 Lions – Time Is The Enemy CD
RES066 Bad Blood – Inner Peace Outer Grief CD/LP
RES067 Just Say Go! – Where It Ends CDep/7"
RES068 Parkway Drive – Horizons CD
RES069 Madball – Infiltrate The System CD
RES070 Terror – Rhythm Amongst The Chaos CDep
RES071 Coué Method – To Mock A Vapid World CD
RES072 Carpathian – Wrecked 7"
RES073 The Gaslight Anthem – Sink Or Swim CD
RES074 The Gaslight Anthem – Senor And The Queen CDep
RES075 Her Nightmare – Come Anarchy Come Ruin CD
RES076 The Dead Walk! – Hunting Humans 7"
RES077 50 Lions/Down To Nothing – Split CDep
RES078 Carpathian – Isolation CD/LP
RES079 Clever Species – Modern Problems CD
RES080 Irrelevant – New Guilt CD
RES081 Confession – Can’t Live Can’t Breathe CDep
RES082 A Death In The Family – This Microscopic War LP
RES083 Tom Gabel – Heart Burns CDep
RES084 A Death In The Family – Small Town Stories CD
RES085 Cry Murder – Above Us The Waves CD
RES086 50 Lions – Self Titled 7″
RES087 Break Even – The Bright Side CD
RES088 Blkout – Total Depravity CD/LP
RES089 Parkway Drive – The DVD
RES090 50 Lions – Where Life Expires CD
RES091 Confession – Cancer CD
RES092 Bane – Perth 7:58am CDep
RES093 Extortion – Loose Screws CD/10″
RES094 Toe To Toe – The Best Defence Is Attack CD
RES095 Toe To Toe – Tao CD
RES096 Toe To Toe – Consolidated CD
RES097 Toe To Toe – Artusto Gatti CD
RES098 A Death In The Family – Origins 10"/CD
RES099 Blkout – No Justice No Peace 7"
RES100 Parkway Drive – Deep Blue CD
RES101 Miles Away – Endless Roads

References

Discographies of Australian record labels
Heavy metal discographies